Hirasiella is a genus of air-breathing land snails, terrestrial pulmonate gastropod molluscs in the family Charopidae. The genus is monotypic, being represented by a single species, Hirasiella clara.

References

Endodontidae
Taxa named by Henry Augustus Pilsbry
Gastropod genera
Taxonomy articles created by Polbot